Kaajal Bakrania, better known by her stage name Kayper, is a DJ, producer and radio presenter from the United Kingdom.

2011–present
In 2011, Kayper won "Best Club DJ" at the Brit Asia TV Music Awards.

On 30 December 2015, Kayper released her single "What You Say" on Eton Messy Records.

Discography

Singles and EPs
 "Gimme Some" – Mad Decent (2011)
 "Magic Faces" – Futurebox Records (2013)
 "Out My Mind" – Main Course (2013)
 "Someone" – Spinnin' Deep (2014)
 Terminal EP – Eton Messy Records (2015)
 "What You Say" – Eton Messy Records (2015)

Remixes
 "Reach Out To Me" – Hard Times (2014)
 "Next Lifetime" (Erykah Badu remix) – Kayper (2015)

References

External links

BBC Asian Network presenters
British people of Indian descent
British radio presenters
British record producers
Club DJs
British hip hop DJs
Women DJs
Living people
DJs from London
Gujarati people
21st-century women musicians
British women record producers
British women radio presenters
Year of birth missing (living people)